Tran-Sister was the first and only single released by the new wave band Neo, fronted by ex-Milk 'N' Cookies guitarist Ian North (vocals). Then, North, born in New York, was living in England since 1976, after the demise of his proto punk band Milk 'N' Cookies. Recorded by North and session musicians, who were Steve Byrd (guitar), John McCoy (bass) and Bryson Graham (drums). Byrd and McCoy left to join Gillan shortly afterwards. North returned to USA in 1979, after his VISA ran out.

By the time, a then waited album was also recorded, Neo, which was released in 1979, after Neo split up and North decided to be a solo artist. Neo was released as an Ian North album.

Track listing
 A1: "Tran-Sister" - 2:28 
 B1: "A Failed Pop Song" - 2:24

Personnel

Members of Neo
 Ian North: vocals
 Steve Byrd: guitar
 John McCoy: bass guitar
 Bryson Graham: drums

Producers
 Ian North (A1)
 Steve Royal (B1)

External links
 Discography — Neo, Ian North

1978 debut singles
1978 songs
Jet Records singles
British new wave songs
Song articles with missing songwriters